Jyotsna Jyoti Bhatt (6 March 194011 July 2020) was an Indian ceramist and potter. She first studied at and then for forty years taught at the Maharaja Sayajirao University of Baroda .

Biography
Jyotsna Bhatt was born on 6 March 1940 in Mandvi, Kutch State (now Kutch, Gujarat). She studied at the Sir J. J. School of Art in Bombay (now Mumbai) for a year. Later she joined the Maharaja Sayajirao University of Baroda in 1958 to study sculpture under Sankho Chaudhuri. She became interested in ceramics there. She studied ceramics under Jolyon Hofsted at the Brooklyn Museum Art School in the borough of Brooklyn in New York City in the United States during the mid 1960s. She returned to India and settled in Baroda (now Vadodara). In 1972, she joined the Department of Sculpture's ceramic studio in the Faculty of Fine Arts, Maharaja Sayajirao University of Baroda as a professor. She worked there for 40 years and retired as the Head of the Department of Ceramics in 2002.

Jyotsna Bhatt died on 11 July 2020, two days after suffering a stroke. She was cremated at Vadi Wadi crematorium in Baroda.

Style
Bhatt's works are collected across the world. During her long career she experimented with both stoneware and terracotta. In her ceramic work, she preferred matte and satin matte glazes in combination with teal blue to moss green and other earth tones. She frequently used alkaline earths, amorphous moulds and various minerals merging modern and traditional styles in her works. Her works reflected her interest in nature. Her numerous works depict cats, dogs, birds, lotus buds, toys and platters.

Personal life 
Jyotsna Bhatt met Jyoti Bhatt, a painter, during her college years and they married later. They lived in Vadodara. They had a daughter, Jaii.

References

1940 births
2020 deaths
Indian women ceramists
Maharaja Sayajirao University of Baroda alumni
Academic staff of Maharaja Sayajirao University of Baroda
People from Vadodara
People from Kutch district
Indian potters
20th-century Indian women artists
20th-century ceramists
21st-century Indian women artists
21st-century ceramists
Brooklyn Museum Art School alumni